Malaya Shumakovka is a rural locality in Shumakovsky Selsoviet Rural Settlement, Kursky District, Kursk Oblast, Russia. Population:

Geography 
The village is located on the Mlodat River (a left tributary of the Seym), 98 km from the Russia–Ukraine border, 13 km south-east of the district center – the town Kursk, 3.5 km from the selsoviet center – Bolshoye Shumakovo.

 Climate
Malaya Shumakovka has a warm-summer humid continental climate (Dfb in the Köppen climate classification).

Transport 
Malaya Shumakovka is located 4.5 km from the federal route  (Kursk – Voronezh –  "Kaspy" Highway; a part of the European route ), 3 km from the road of regional importance  (Kursk – Bolshoye Shumakovo – Polevaya via Lebyazhye), 2.5 km from the nearest railway station Konaryovo (railway line Klyukva — Belgorod).

The rural locality is situated 11 km from Kursk Vostochny Airport, 115 km from Belgorod International Airport and 196 km from Voronezh Peter the Great Airport.

References

Notes

Sources

Rural localities in Kursky District, Kursk Oblast